Davide Di Gennaro (born 16 June 1988) is an Italian professional footballer who plays as an attacking midfielder for Serie D club Portici.

Club career

Early career 

Di Gennaro is a product of Milan's youth system, which he joined from amateur side Cimiano in 1995. There he went on to become the captain of their under-20 squad. On 19 May 2007, he made his first team debut, aged 18, in a Serie A game against Udinese. For the 2007–08 season the young midfielder was loaned out to Bologna in Serie B, where he scored two goal in 22 appearances, playing an important part in the club's promotion to Serie A.

Serie A debut 
In August 2008, Di Gennaro was transferred to Genoa in a co-ownership deal, in compensation for Marco Borriello, who was brought back to Milan. Nevertheless, after only making one league appearance, he was loaned out to Reggina, just before the transfers deadline. Oddly enough, he scored his only goal of the season – his first in Serie A – in the game against Milan at the San Siro, on 7 February 2009. The Rossoneri later equalised and the match finished 1–1.

On 27 June 2009, Milan reclaimed Di Gennaro from the co-ownership with Genoa via a blind auction, after the two teams had failed to reach an agreement, for €1.25 million. Di Gennaro signed a new 3-year deal. However, during a pre-season friendly he suffered a broken metatarsal, which forced him out for the first months of the season. After recovering from the injury, he struggled to return to form, playing only two Coppa Italia games. To get some more playing time, on 29 January 2010 he was loaned to Livorno for the remainder of the season.

Padova 
For the 2010–11 season, Di Gennaro has been sent on loan to Serie B club Calcio Padova. Like in the previous year, he suffered an injury during the pre-season, which would keep him out for one month. Following his recover, Di Gennaro made his official debut for the club in an away league game against Modena, which Padova lost 1–0, on 5 September 2010. Three weeks later, on 25 September, he also scored his first goal for the team, in a 2–0 win against Albinoleffe at home. He went on to score 5 goals in 17 league appearances throughout the season. ca. January 2011 Di Gennaro also added one more year to his Milan contract, to last until 30 June 2013.

Modena 
Di Gennaro spent the 2011–12 season on another loan spell to Serie B club Modena, where he scored 10 goals in 32 league appearances.

Spezia 
On 14 July 2012, Di Gennaro signed a permanent deal to join newly promoted Serie B team Spezia for €500,000. During the season, he made 34 appearances in Seria B, scoring 9 goals (5 of which were penalties). He also made one appearance in Coppa Italia, scoring a goal in a 1–2 loss against Cagliari.

Palermo 
On 1 July 2013, he moved to Palermo for free, which Spezia write-down his residual contract value fully, Di Gennaro signed a three-year contract for Palermo.

Vicenza
On 8 September 2014, di Gennaro was signed by Vicenza, on loan.

Cagliari 
After a great season with the Vicenza, in the summer of 2015 he moved to Cagliari, demoted to Serie B.

Lazio 
On 21 July 2017, Di Gennaro was signed by Lazio on a three-year contract.

Salernitana 
On 17 August 2018, Di Gennaro joined Salernitana in Serie B on a season-long loan from Lazio.

Juve Stabia
On 24 July 2019, he joined Juve Stabia on loan.

Later years
On 31 January 2021, he moved to Serie C club Cesena.

On 2 September 2021, he signed with Bari on a one-year contract with an option to renew. On 31 January 2022, his contract was terminated by mutual consent.

On 8 February 2022, Di Gennaro signed with Taranto until the end of the season.

On 13 October 2022, after having been released by Taranto, Di Gennaro joined Serie D club Portici.

International career 
Di Gennaro has played at various level of youth international football, collecting a total of 15 appearances, for the Italy U-16 to U-20 sides.

He made his debut with Italy U-21 on 18 November 2008, in a friendly against Germany.

Career statistics

Club 
As of 20 May 2018

Notes
1European competitions include the UEFA Champions League and UEFA Cup
2Other tournaments include nothing to date

Honours

Club 
A.C. Milan
 UEFA Champions League: 2006–07

Lazio
Supercoppa Italiana: 2017

References

External links 
 Profile at Assocalciatori.it 
 International caps at FIGC.it 

1988 births
Living people
Footballers from Milan
Association football forwards
Italian footballers
Italy under-21 international footballers
Italy youth international footballers
Serie A players
Serie B players
Serie C players
A.C. Milan players
Bologna F.C. 1909 players
Genoa C.F.C. players
Reggina 1914 players
U.S. Livorno 1915 players
Calcio Padova players
Modena F.C. players
Spezia Calcio players
Palermo F.C. players
L.R. Vicenza players
Cagliari Calcio players
S.S. Lazio players
U.S. Salernitana 1919 players
S.S. Juve Stabia players
Cesena F.C. players
S.S.C. Bari players
Taranto F.C. 1927 players